Gunaroš (Hungarian: Gunaras) is a village in Serbia. It is situated in the Bačka Topola municipality, in the North Bačka District, Vojvodina province. The village has a Hungarian ethnic majority of over 97%, and its population numbers 1,441 people (2002 census).

See also
List of places in Serbia
List of cities, towns and villages in Vojvodina

External links
 Castle Engelman, Gunaroš

Places in Bačka